KMVL-FM is a radio station airing a classic country format licensed to Madisonville, Texas, broadcasting on 100.5 MHz FM.  The station is owned by Leon Hunt. Morning show has been anchored by Paul Wright since 2004.

References

External links

Classic country radio stations in the United States
MVL-FM